1409 Isko, provisional designation , is a carbonaceous background asteroid from the central regions of the asteroid belt, approximately 35 kilometers in diameter. It was discovered on 8 January 1937, by astronomer Karl Reinmuth at the Heidelberg-Königstuhl State Observatory in southwest Germany. The asteroid was named after Ise Koch, wife of astronomer Fritz Kubach.

Orbit and classification 

Isko is a non-family asteroid of the main belt's background population. It orbits the Sun in the central asteroid belt at a distance of 2.5–2.8 AU once every 4 years and 5 months (1,599 days). Its orbit has an eccentricity of 0.06 and an inclination of 7° with respect to the ecliptic.

Physical characteristics 

Isko has been characterized as a carbonaceous C-type asteroid by Pan-STARRS photometric survey.

Rotation period 

In December 2001, a rotational lightcurve of Isko was obtained from photometric observations by French amateur astronomers Laurent Bernasconi and René Roy. Lightcurve analysis gave a rotation period of 11.6426 hours with a brightness amplitude of 0.20 magnitude.

Diameter and albedo 

According to the surveys carried out by the Infrared Astronomical Satellite IRAS, the Japanese Akari satellite and the NEOWISE mission of NASA's Wide-field Infrared Survey Explorer, Isko measures between 34.62 and 38.46 kilometers in diameter and its surface has an albedo between 0.032 and 0.0805.

The Collaborative Asteroid Lightcurve Link derives an albedo of 0.0514 and a diameter of 35.34 kilometers based on an absolute magnitude of 11.1.

Naming 

This minor planet was named after Ise Koch, wife of German astronomer Fritz Kubach (1912–1945)(de) The official naming citation was mentioned in The Names of the Minor Planets by Paul Herget in 1955.

References

External links 
 Asteroid Lightcurve Database (LCDB), query form (info )
 Dictionary of Minor Planet Names, Google books
 Asteroids and comets rotation curves, CdR – Observatoire de Genève, Raoul Behrend
 Discovery Circumstances: Numbered Minor Planets (1)-(5000) – Minor Planet Center
 
 

001409
Named minor planets
Discoveries by Karl Wilhelm Reinmuth
19370108